The 1990 by-election in Upper Bann was caused by the death of the sitting Ulster Unionist Party Member of Parliament Harold McCusker on 2 February 1990.

The by-election was especially notable for three reasons. Firstly, the Sinn Féin candidate in the election, Sheena Campbell, was murdered by the UVF in Belfast on 16 October 1992.

Eleven candidates stood in the by-election, which to date is the record for a parliamentary election in Northern Ireland. Secondly, amongst the eleven were candidates for the Conservative Party and the Social Democratic Party (SDP), both contesting parliamentary elections in Northern Ireland for the first time since the "Equal Citizenship" campaign had sought to get the major UK parties to organise in the province. Finally the successful Ulster Unionist candidate was David Trimble, who five years later would become the leader of the party.

The SDP candidate took only 154 votes, and finished in eleventh and last place – the worst performance in a by-election by any party with MPs sitting in the House of Commons since the English National Party in the 1976 Rotherham by-election.

Results

General Election result, 1987

References

External links 
A Vision Of Britain Through Time (Constituency elector numbers)

Upper Bann by-election
Upper Bann by-election
Upper Bann by-election
20th century in County Armagh
20th century in County Down
By-elections to the Parliament of the United Kingdom in County Armagh constituencies
By-elections to the Parliament of the United Kingdom in County Down constituencies